Talbid (Village ID 564533) is a village near Karad, in Satara district of state Maharashtra, India. According to the 2011 census it has a population of 4572 living in 1001 households.

References

Cities and towns in Satara district
Villages in Satara district